Purcell's gecko (Pachydactylus purcelli) is a species of lizard in the family Gekkonidae. The species is endemic to southern Africa.

Etymology
The specific name, purcelli, is in honor of South African entomologist William Frederick Purcell.

Geographic range
P. purcelli is found in Namibia and South Africa.

Reproduction
P. purcelli is oviparous.

References

Further reading
Boulenger GA (1910). "A Revised List of the South African Reptiles and Batrachians, with Synoptic Tables, special reference to the specimens in the South African Museum, and Descriptions of New Species". Annals of the South African Museum 5: 455–543. (Pachydactylus purcelli, new species, p. 494).

Pachydactylus
Geckos of Africa
Reptiles of Namibia
Reptiles of South Africa
Reptiles described in 1910
Taxa named by George Albert Boulenger